Eulithis propulsata, known generally as the barred yellow or currant eulithis moth, is a species of geometrid moth in the family Geometridae. It is found in North America.

The MONA or Hodges number for Eulithis propulsata is 7199.

References

Further reading

External links

 

Hydriomenini
Articles created by Qbugbot
Moths described in 1862